The Mansfelder Bergwerksbahn is an  long  gauge heritage railway in Saxony-Anhalt, Germany.

History
Copper ore has been mined around Mansfeld since 1199. At first it carried only goods, but in 1882 began carrying miners. In 1883, workshops were established at Klostermansfeld.

Transporter wagons were introduced in the 1930s, as well as air brakes on rolling stock. Traffic on the Mansfelder Bergwerksbahn reached its peak in 1955. The first diesel locomotives were introduced in 1961. In 1965, steam locomotive No. 10 became the first narrow gauge locomotive in Germany converted to heavy oil fuel.

Between 1964-69, the last copper mines at Eisleben and Hettstedt were closed. Carriage of passengers ceased in 1970. The smeltery in Eisleben closed in 1972, and the track between Eisleben and Helbra was lifted some years later. In 1989, the smeltery and power station at Helbra closed, and with it the railway.

Preservation

In 1990, the railway between Hettstedt and Klostermansfeld reopened as a heritage railway. By 1993, all other lines had been lifted. In 1994, the remaining line was transferred to the Mansfelder Bergwerksbahn e.V. It is maintained as part of Germany's industrial and mining heritage.

See also 
 Otavi Mining and Railway Company: a copper ore railway in German South West Africa
 White Knob Copper Electric Railway: a copper ore railway in the United States
 BHP Nevada Railroad: a copper ore railway in the United States

References

Heritage railways in Germany
Mining railways
Railway lines in Saxony-Anhalt
750 mm gauge railways in Germany
Mining in Germany
Copper industry